PSIS Semarang with two foreign footballers Julio Alcorsé and Ronald Fagundez started the 2014 Liga Indonesia Premier Division superbly, topping the standings of Group 4, with only 1 defeat, to qualify for the a quarter-finals.
PSIS Semarang's striker Hari Nur Yulianto became the 4th top scorer with 14 goals under Abblode Yao Rudy (Persiwa Wamena, 17 goals), Brima Pepito Sanusie (Martapura FC, 16 goals), and Fernando Gaston Soler (Pusamania Borneo F.C., 15 goals), while Mahesa Jenar's other striker Julio Alcorsé was ranked 7th with 13 goals.

Match Fixed Scandal (Sepak Bola Gajah Scandal)
The hard-won effort built since the start of the season had to end in the final game which only fight over to the group winner position. PSS Sleman and PSIS Semarang are involved in a scandal in which the two clubs were both desperate to avoid facing Pusamania Borneo F.C. Management argued "because it avoids Indonesian football mafia, they assess Pusamania Borneo F.C. is set to win the 2014 Liga Indonesia Premier Division so we avoid it". 
As a result of this scandal, Laskar Mahesa Djenar was disqualified from the semi-finals round. While coach Eko Riyadi, Saptono, Fadly Manna and Catur Adi Nugraha get life sentence not to play in Indonesian football and fine each 100 million Rupiah.

Squad 
Update November 2014

Top scorers 
  Julio Alcorsé 13 Gol
  Muhamad Yunus 7 Gol
  Ronald Fagundez 7 Gol
  Fauzan Fajri 6 Gol
  Ahmad Noviandani 5 Gol

First stage

Match results

2nd Stage (Group J)

Match results

Quarter-Final (Group N)

Results

References 

Indonesian football clubs 2014 season
PSIS Semarang seasons